Stéphane Heuet (Brest) is a French comics artist. He is notable in the Franco-Belgian comics ("BD," Bandes dessinées) genre for having tackled one of the most literary of modern novels, À la recherche du temps perdu by Marcel Proust (1988).

As a break from the Proust project in 2010 he published a collection of 18 maritime stories by authors such as Pierre Mac Orlan and Herman Melville with watercolour illustrations.

References

French comics writers
Living people
Year of birth missing (living people)
French male writers